Gwacheon National Science Museum is a national museum in Gwacheon, South Korea. It opened in 2008.

Hall of Fame

Main exhibitions
The hall of fame is a place to praise the achievements of the scientists who contributed in the development of science and technology and to look around how Korea has developed and what Korea has achieved. It is dedicated to 31 honorable scientists such as Jang Yeong-sil, Heo Jun, Benjamin Whisoh Lee, and Seok Joo-myung. It consists of 35 exhibits, including 2 experiment exhibits such as “I am also an honorable scientist.” The achievements of the scientists are told in a storytelling way.

Honorable scientists from the old days, meet the brilliant past
Like the invention of gunpowder weapons of Moo-seon Choi or what the famous Joseon engineer Young-shil Jang had done, the brilliant achievements of the main figures who led the science and technology powerhouse in the 14~15th century can be seen here. The achievements and relics of the scientists who led the Korean science and technology at Renaissance, such as Joon Heo and Dae-yong Hong, can also be seen here.

Honorable contemporary scientists, overcome the pains
Here scientists who contributed in Korea stepping up into one of the 10 top science and technology developed countries and getting over the pains of Japanese colonization and Korean War are honored. The stories are classified into “Pioneers of Science and Technology,” “Constructing the footholds of Science and Technology,” “Researches that expanded the Horizon of Knowledge,” and “Researches that changed the lives of Koreans.”

Digital archive, reviewing at once
“Korea’s glorious history of science” is an archive table that shows the positions and achievements of honorable scientists in time order, starting from the 14th century.

I am also an Honorable Scientist, dreaming of becoming a scientist
It is a photo zone where visitors can exhibit what they want to achieve with reliefs of their face.

Nobel Prize and Me

Main exhibitions
Visitors can experience the achievements of Nobel prize winners, especially the ones that are convenient in real life. There are 31 displays in 5 corners that form a shape of a house. Some examples are ‘Nobel car race’ and ‘DNA rolling ball.’

Nobel prize hero, meet the saviors of human race
In the “Nobel prize hero” corner, scientists who changed peoples’ lives dramatically, such as Marie Curie, James Watson who found out the structure of DNA, and Fleming who found penicillin are honored.

Nobel prize winners in Physiology or Medicine in the library
“Nobel prize winners in Physiology or Medicine changes the view of life” tells how researches like discovering vaccine, developing artificial vitamins, and in vitro fertilization helped people to be healthy. “DNA rolling ball” is an experiment exhibit that show how the gene synthesis, which produces fluorescent fish and blue rose, works.

Nobel prize winners in Physics in the living room
“Nobel prize winners in Physics finds out the origin of space” shows how the winners found out that the universe was made 13.8 billion years ago. There is also a model of a large particle accelerator to show how scientists tried to find out what the smallest particle is.
“Nobel prize winners in Physics promoted the abilities of human” tells how television, digital cameras, telephones, navigation systems, and computers were invented.

Nobel prize winners in Chemistry in the kitchen
“Nobel prize winners in nature” shows the achievement of winners in chemistry like detergents, frying pan, plastic products, artificial dye and spices, and fermented foods.
“Nobel prize winners in vehicle” shows the contribution of winners to vehicles with VR racing games.

Images

See also
National Science Museum, South Korea
List of museums in South Korea

External links

 Official Site
 terraceone
 m tower

Planetaria
Science museums in South Korea
Museums in Gyeonggi Province
National museums of South Korea
Open-air museums in South Korea
Museums established in 2008
Buildings and structures in Gwacheon